The Black Catholic Theological Symposium is a Catholic organization founded in 1978 to promote theological education and research concerning Black Catholics.

History 
In 1978, the first meeting of the Black Catholic Theological Symposium, organized by Thaddeus Posey, O.F.M. and sponsored by the National Black Catholic Clergy Caucus, was held in Baltimore, Maryland. It worked on defining black theology and clarifying its relationship with the black consciousness movement and related understandings of violence and separatism. Including theologians such as Thea Bowman, M. Shawn Copeland, Jamie T. Phelps, and Cyprian Davis, its proceedings were published as Theology: A Portrait in Black.

The second meeting of the Symposium was held in 1979 on the theme of "Nguba Saba." It would not hold another meeting until 1991, when convened by Sr Jamie T. Phelps, O.P., but has held meetings annually ever since.

Conveners 

 Fr Thaddeus Posey, OFM
 Sr Jamie T. Phelps, OP
 Dr. M. Shawn Copeland
 Dr. Kimberly Flint Hamilton
 Fr Bryan Massingale
 Dr. C. Vanessa White
 Dr. Kathleen Dorsey Bellow
 Fr Maurice J. Nutt, CSsR
Dr. Kimberly Lymore

See also 

 Black Catholicism
Black Catholic Movement
Black theology

Bibliography

External links 
 Black Catholic Theological Symposium

Christian organizations established in 1979
African-American Christianity
Catholic theology and doctrine